The High Sheriff of Tipperary was the Sovereign's judicial representative in County Tipperary. Initially an office for a lifetime, assigned by the Sovereign, the High Sheriff became annually appointed from the Provisions of Oxford in 1258. Besides his judicial importance, he had ceremonial and administrative functions and executed High Court Writs.

History
The first (High) Shrievalties were established before the Norman Conquest in 1066 and date back to Saxon times. In 1908, an Order in Council made the Lord-Lieutenant the Sovereign's prime representative in a county and reduced the High Sheriff's precedence. Despite however that the office retained his responsibilities for the preservation of law and order in a county.

County Tipperary was a liberty administered by the Earls of Ormond, who thereby appointed the Sheriff, until it was extinguished as part of the second Duke's attainder for supporting the Jacobite rising of 1715. It then became a normal county under the direct control of the King.

In Tipperary and in four of the counties of the province of Connaught the office ceased to exist with the establishment of the Irish Free State in 1922.

High Sheriffs of Tipperary
1295: Walter le Bret
1318: John Pembroke
1405: James Butler
1605: Hon Thomas Butler
1610: Piers Butler fitzJames of Lismalin
1612: William St John of Skaddanston
1613: Thomas Cantwell
1614: Richard Butler of Knocktopher
1615: William O'Meary of Lisenoskey
1616: Daniel O'Bryen
1618: Gilbert Butler
1619: Robert Carew
1620: William St John
1625: William O'Meara

English Interregnum, 1649–1660

1657: Richard le Hunte of Cashel
1658: Sir Thomas Stanley
1659: Henry Prittie

Charles II, 1660–1685

1660:
1666: Thomas Sadleir of Sopwell hall
1672: Eliah Greene

1673:
1674: John Pyke or Pike
1675: Richard Moore of Clonmel
1676:
1684:

James II, 1685–1689
1686: Anthony Maude
1687: Isaac Walden

William III, 1689–1702

1689:
1695:

1696: Humphrey Minchin of Ballinakill
1697:
1698: Thomas Moore of Chancellorstown
1701:

Anne, 1702–1714

1702:
1703: Kingsmill Pennefather of New Park
1707:

1708: Kingsmill Pennefather of New Park (2nd term)
1709: Sir William Parsons, 2nd Bt
1712: Matthew Pennefather
1713:
Thomas Armstrong of Mealiffe

George I, 1714–1727

1714:
1717: John Carleton of Darling Hill
1719: Kilner Brasier
1720:

1721:
1722: Guy Moore of Abbey
1723:
1724: Richard Pennefather
1725:
1726: William Baker of Lismacue

George II, 1727–1760

1727:
1729: Robert Marshall
1731: Lovelace Taylor of Noan and Ballinure
1732:
1733: John Minchin of Annagh
1736: Paul Minchin of Balinakill
1738: William Armstrong of Farney Castle and Mount Heaton
1741: Sir Thomas Dancer, 4th Bt
1743:

1744: Richard Moore of Barne House, Clonmel
1745:
1750: Kingsmill Pennefather
1753: John Bloomfield of Redwood
1757: Stephen Moore
1758:
1759: John Bayly of Debsborough

George III, 1760–1820

1760:
1764: William Barker
1765: Sir Thomas Maude, 2nd Bt
1768: Anthony Parker of Castle Lough
1770: Henry Prittie
1772: Peter Holmes of Peterfield
1777: Richard Biggs of Castle Biggs
1778:
1779: Mark Lidwill of Clonmore, Cormackstown and Annfield
1780:
1781: Robert Nicholson of Wilmar
1782: Richard Butler Hamilton Lowe of Lowe's Green
1783: James Ffogerty of Castle ffogerty
1784: Richard or Stephen Moore of Chancellor's Town
1785: Thomas Barton of Grove
1786: Stephen Moore
1789: Daniel Mansergh of Cashel
1790:
1793: John Bagwell

1795: Peter Holmes of Peterfield
1797: John Carden
1798: Sir Thomas Judkin-FitzGerald, 1st Bt
1803: Thomas Going
1804: Henry Osborne
1805: William Hutchinson
1806: George Lidwill of Dromard
1807: John Poe
1808: Henry Langley
1809: John Southcote Mansergh of Grenane
1810: Dunbar Barton of Rochestown
1811: Benjamin Bagwell
1812: Thomas Prendergast
1813: William Quinn
1814: Fergus Langley
1815: Richard Creagh
1816: Pierce Archer Butler
1817: Vere Dawson Hunt
1818: Nathaniel Taylor of Noan
1819: Kingsmill Pennefather † / succeeded by Sir John Judkin-Fitzgerald, 2nd Bt

George IV, 1820–1830

1820: Sir Arthur Carden, 2nd Bt
1821: Chambre Brabazon Barker
1822: John Hely Hutchinson
1823: Sir Robert William O'Callaghan
1824: Sir Henry Robert Carden, 3rd Bt

1825: William Barton of Grove, Fethard, Tipperary
1826: Mathew Pennefather of New Park
1827: Hon. George O'Callaghan
1828: William Perry of Woodrooff
1829: Matthew Jacob

William IV, 1830–1837

1830: John Trant
1831:
1832: Stephen Moore
1833:

1834: John Bagwell of Marlfield
1835:
1836: Maurice Crosbie Moore of Mooresfoot

Victoria, 1837–1901

1837:
1838: Hon. Francis Aldborough Prittie
1840: Henry Sadleir Prittie
1841: Thomas Edmund Lalor
1842: Richard Wilis Gason of Richmond
1843:
1844:
1845: John Bayley
1846: John Trant of Dovea
1847: Richard Hely-Hutchinson, 4th Earl of Donoughmore
1848: Richard Pennefather of Knockevan, Clonmel
1849: Sir John Cravan Carden, 4th Bt of the Priory
1850: Lieutenant-Colonel Wray Palliser of Derryluskan
1851: George Ryan
1852: Sir Thomas Bernard Going Dancer, 6th Bt
1853:
1855: Thomas Butler-Stoney of Portland Park
1856: Edward Bagwell Purefoy of Greenfield
1857: Edmond James Power-Lalor of Long Orchard
1858: Honourable George Stephens Gough of Rathronan, Clonmel
1859: Thomas Sadleir of Castletown and Ballinderry
1860: Thomas Lalor of Cregg
1861: Sir William Osborne, 13th Baronet, Beechwood
1862: Charles Clarke of Graiguenoe Park
1864: Hon. Bowes Daly
1864: James Lenigan
1865: Robert St John Cole Bowen of Bowen's Court
1866:
1867: Stephen Charles Moore of Barne
1868: Laurence Waldrov Waldron of Helen Park

1869: Richard Bagwell of Marlfield
1870: Vincent Scully of Mantle Hill
1871: Francis Wise Low of Kilshane
1872: William Bassett Holmes of St David's
1873: Andrew Carden
1873: James Fogarty of Castle Fogarty
1874: John Bayly of Debsborough
1875:
1876: Anthony Parker
1877: Arthur John Moore of Mooresfort
1878: George Edward Ryan of Inch
1879: William Gibson
1880: Thomas Butler of Ballycarron
1881: Henry Jesse Lloyd of Lloydsborough
1882: Sir John Craven Carden, 5th Bt.
1883: Hon. Henry O'Callaghan Prittie
1884: Benjamin Frend Going
1885: Stephen Moore of Barne
1886: Hon. Cosby Godolphin Trench of Sopwell Hall.
1887: John Vivian Ryan-Lenigan of Castle fogerty
1888: Andrew Murray Carden of Barnane
1889: FitzGibbon Trant
1890:
1891: Charles Neville Clarke of Graiguenoe Park
1891: William Bassett Traherne Holmes of St David's
1892: James Netterville Atkinson of Ashley Park
1893: Austin Samuel Cooper
1894: John Bayly of Debsborough
1895: William Arthur Riall of Annerville
1896: Robert George Edward Twiss of Birdhill House
1897: Louis Henry Grubb
1898: Evelyn Fortescue Lloyd of Cranagh Castle
1899: William Godfrey Dunham Massy
1900: Edward Henry Saunders of Kilavalla

Edward VII, 1901–1910

1901: Charles Edward Tuthill
1902: Samuel Phillips of Gaile
1903: Richard Henry FitzRichard Falkiner
1904: Randal Kingsmill Moore of Barne
1905: Marcus Beresford Armstrong of Mealiffe

1906: Frederick Rhodes Armitage
1907: Walter Charles Butler-Stoney of Portland Park
1908: Standish Grady John Parker-Hutchinson of Timoney Park and Castle Lough, Tipperary
1909: Solomon Watson of Ballingarrane
1910: Charles Caleb Coote Webb of Kilmore, Nenagh

George V, 1910–1922

1911: Robert Joseph Cooke
1912: Hardress Gilbert Holmes
1913: Francis Simon Low
1914: Cavendish Walter Gartside-Tipping
1915: Charles Mayne Going
1916: Samuel Richard Grubb

1917: Darby Scully
1918: George Richard Cooke
1919: Richard Butler
1922:

Notes
† Died in office

References

 
Tipperary
History of County Tipperary